Thiruvangoor (തിരുവങ്ങൂർ) is a small village  away from Kozhikode, Kerala, India. It lies to the east of the Arabian Sea (Kappad) and west of Kuniyil Kadavu. Portuguese navigator Vasco de Gama is believed to have landed near Thiruvangoor, at Kappad, during one of his voyages, on 20 May 1498. Thiruvangoor sits on a national highway. Nearby major towns are Atholi and Koyilandy. The Kuniyil Kadavu Bridge allows for transportation between Thiruvangoor and Atholi town.

Education
Thiruvangoor Higher Secondary School is the village's largest educational facility. Thiruvangoor is part of the Chemancheri panchayat.

Health
There is a community health centre adjacent to Thiruvangoor Higher Secondary School. There is a road to Kappad Beach just beyond the primary health centre, from the national highway.

Transportation
Thiruvangoor connects to other parts of India through Kozhikode & Koyilandy town.  The nearest airports are at Kozhikode and Kannur.  The nearest railway station is at Koyilandy & Kozhikode railway station is 16 km away.  National Highway 66 passes through Koyilandy, the northern stretch connecting to Mangalore, Goa and Mumbai.  The southern stretch connects to Cochin and Trivandrum.  The eastern part of National Highway 54 going through Kuttiady connects to Mananthavady, Mysore and Bangalore.

Stats 

 Locality Name : Thiruvangoor (തിരുവങ്ങൂർ )
 Block Name : Panthalayani
 District : Kozhikode
 State : Kerala
 Division : North Kerala
 Language : Malayalam and English, Hindi, Tamil
 Current Time 08:42 AM
 Date: Tuesday, Mar 23, 2021 (IST)
 Time zone: IST (UTC+5:30)
 Elevation / Altitude: 17 meters. Above Sea level
 Telephone Code / Std Code: 0496
 Assembly constituency : Quilandy assembly constituency
 Assembly MLA : k.dasan
 Lok Sabha constituency : Vatakara parliamentary constituency
 Parliament MP : K. MURALEEDHARAN
 Serpanch Name : 
 Serpanch Name
 Pin Code : 673304
 Post Office Name : Chemancheri
 Main Village Name : Chemancheri
 Alternate Village Name : Thiruvangoor Colony, Thiruvangoor East

Location

References

http://www.fordham.edu/halsall/mod/1497degama.asp

Koyilandy area
Villages in Kozhikode district